Red Garland's Piano is an album by jazz pianist Red Garland, released in 1957 on Prestige Records. It features tracks recorded mainly on March 22, 1957.

Track listing 
"Please Send Me Someone to Love" (Percy Mayfield) - 9:51
"Stompin' at the Savoy" (Benny Goodman, Andy Razaf, Edgar Sampson, Chick Webb) - 3:12
"The Very Thought of You" (Ray Noble) - 4:12
"Almost Like Being in Love" (Alan Jay Lerner, Frederick Loewe) - 4:52
"If I Were a Bell" (Frank Loesser) - 6:41
"I Know Why (And So Do You)" (Harry Warren, Mack Gordon) - 4:50
"I Can't Give You Anything but Love" (Dorothy Fields, Jimmy McHugh) - 5:05
"But Not for Me" (George Gershwin, Ira Gershwin) - 5:52

Personnel
Red Garland - piano
Paul Chambers - bass
Art Taylor - drums

References 

1957 albums
Albums produced by Bob Weinstock
Prestige Records albums
Red Garland albums
Albums recorded at Van Gelder Studio